Elections for the Royal Borough of Kensington and Chelsea were held on 6 May 2010.  The 2010 General Election and other local elections took place on the same day.

In London borough council elections the entire council is elected every four years, unlike some other English councils, where a third of the councillors are elected for a four-year term in three successive years, with no elections in the fourth.

Summary of results 

|}

Ward Results

Abingdon

Brompton

Campden

Colville

Courtfield

Cremorne

Earl's Court

References

2010
Kensington and Chelsea London Borough Council election
Kensington and Chelsea London Borough Council election
21st century in the Royal Borough of Kensington and Chelsea